Mitchelle'l Sium is an American singer and songwriter from Houston, Texas. He was discovered on Myspace.com and brought to Grand Hustle Records by general manager, Hannah Kang. In 2008, Sium signed a record deal with Atlanta-based record label Grand Hustle Records, founded by American rapper T.I. Sium has collaborated with some of the most prominent artists in the hip hop industry, such as TI, Jeezy, Ty Dolla $ign, BJ The Chicago Kid, Charlie Wilson, Lil Duval, B.o.B, Yo Gotti, 8Ball & MJG and Nelly, among others.

Early life
Mitchelle'l Sium was born in Houston, Texas, to a father from Eritrea, a nation on the Eastern coast of Africa, and a mother of Creole descent.

Musical career

Career beginnings
In late 2007, Sium capitalized upon the promotional capacity of the internet and used Myspace as a platform to expand the reach of his music. He captured the attention of Hannah Kang, general manager for Atlanta-based record label Grand Hustle Records and was introduced to American rapper and Grand Hustle label-boss, T.I. In 2008, Sium had signed a recording contract with Grand Hustle Records. In 2008, Sium was featured on a song titled “Collect Call”, which was included as a bonus track on T.I.’s highly acclaimed sixth album, Paper Trail. He teamed up with T.I. again in 2010, alongside Scarface, on the song "How Life Changed", from the No Mercy album. On September 23, 2011, he released a song titled "Only a Few". In 2011, he appeared on Jeezy’s long-awaited Thug Motivation 103: Hustlerz Ambition album, on a song called "Higher Learning." His debut single "Irene" features Maybach Music's Wale, production by Grand Hustle record producer C-Gutta and co-written by actor Omar Epps.

Artistry

Voice and songwriting
The in-house disc jockey of Grand Hustle, DJ MLK, has described Sium as "sound[ing] like a young Maxwell." In 2012, American radio show host and internet celebrity B. Scott, wrote in a review that he "sounds a bit like Maxwell meets Van Hunt". Also in 2012, after the release of a song titled "Irene", from Sium's mixtape of the same name, grownfolksmusic.com wrote "Mitchelle’l already has a smooth, soulful vibe going that is reminiscent of artists like Maxwell and Robin Thicke and works just fine without a guest rapper. Hopefully there are more sensual, smoothed-out tracks like this one coming down the line from Mitchelle’l."

Influences
Mitchelle’l grew up listening to and was deeply inspired by the kings of soul music, including Marvin Gaye, Al Green and Otis Redding. He later gravitated towards more contemporary R&B offerings from R. Kelly, Jodeci and D’Angelo. As he began to create music, he incorporated the elements that had inspired him from a musical sense along with the things he experienced in the world around him.

Discography

Mixtapes

Singles as featured artist

Guest appearances

References

External links
 
 
 
 

Date of birth missing (living people)
Living people
21st-century African-American male singers
African-American male singer-songwriters
American hip hop singers
American people of Creole descent
American people of Eritrean descent
American rhythm and blues singer-songwriters
American soul singers
Grand Hustle Records artists
Musicians from Houston
Singer-songwriters from Texas
Year of birth missing (living people)